The Laser Integration Line (LIL) is a prototype for the Laser Mégajoule (LMJ) located at CEA-CESTA.  Whereas the LMJ is planned to comprise 240 laser beams and deliver 1.8MJ, the LIL delivers just one sixtieth of the energy, 30kJ.

References

Bibliography

Further reading 
 
 

Inertial confinement fusion research lasers